The following is a chronological list of films in the Malayalam cinema and language released in the 1990s.

Films by year 
 Malayalam films of 1990
 Malayalam films of 1991
 Malayalam films of 1992
 Malayalam films of 1993
 Malayalam films of 1994
 Malayalam films of 1995
 Malayalam films of 1996
 Malayalam films of 1997
 Malayalam films of 1998
 Malayalam films of 1999

1990s
Lists of 1990s films
Malayalam